The 2015 Longford Senior Football Championship is the 99th running of the Longford GAA's premier club Gaelic football tournament for senior graded teams in County Longford, Ireland since the first County Championship was held in 1890 (98 completed since 1890, 1 started but not completed in 1891). The 2015 tournament consisted of 12 teams, with the winner going on to represent Longford in the Leinster Senior Club Football Championship. The championship starts with a league stage and then progresses to a knock out stage.

Killoe Young Emmets were the defending champions after they defeated Mullinalaghta St Columba's in the previous years final, and they successfully defended their title, defeating Abbeylara 1-14 to 1-11 on 4 October 2015 in Pearse Park.

This was Carrickedmond's return to the senior grade in 3 years since relegation in 2011 after claiming the 2014 Longford Intermediate Football Championship title, however they were due to make the drop straight back down to the Intermediate grade after losing a Relegation Playoff final before the format for the 2016 S.F.C. was changed.

Team changes 

The following teams have changed division since the 2014 championship season.

To S.F.C. 
Promoted from I.F.C.
 Carrickedmond – (Intermediate Champions)

From S.F.C. 
Relegated to I.F.C.
 Ardagh St Patrick's

Group stage 
All 12 teams enter the competition at this stage. The top 8 teams go into a random unseeded draw for the quarter-finals while the bottom 4 teams will enter a Relegation Playoff. If teams are level on points and a place in the quarter-final is at stake, a Playoff will be conducted to determine who goes through.

Round 1
 Killoe Young Emmets 1-15, 0-6 Mostrim, 17/7/2015,
 Dromard 0-15, 1-6 Carrickedmond, 18/7/2015,
 Colmcille 0-9, 0-7 Fr. Manning Gaels, 18/7/2015,
 St Mary's Granard 4-9, 1-14 Clonguish, 19/7/2015,
 Abbeylara 3-12, 1-11 Ballymahon, 19/7/2015,
 St Columba's 0-14, 1-4 Longford Slashers, 19/7/2015,

Round 2
 Abbeylara 0-12, 2-6 St Mary's Granard, 24/7/2015,
 Clonguish 2-15, 0-6 Mostrim, 25/7/2015,
 Colmcille 1-14, 0-7 Fr. Manning Gaels, 25/7/2015,
 Longford Slashers 2-8, 0-11 Killoe Young Emmets, 26/7/2015,
 Dromard 3-15, 1-8 Ballymahon, 26/7/2015,
 St Columba's 0-10, 0-8 Carrickedmond, 26/7/2015,

Round 3
 Ballymahon 3-13, 2-7 Fr. Manning Gaels, 7/8/2015,
 Abbeylara 0-9, 0-9 St Columba's, 8/8/2015,
 Longford Slashers 0-9, 1-6 Mostrim, 8/8/2015,
 Colmcille 1-14, 0-7 St Mary's Granard, 8/8/2015,
 Dromard 1-9, 0-11 Killoe Young Emmets, 9/8/2015,
 Clonguish 0-12, 0-4 Carrickedmond, 9/8/2015,

Quarter-Final Playoff
 Killoe Young Emmets 4-16, 2-9 Ballymahon, Keenan Park, 16/8/2015,

Knockout stage 
The top 8 teams from the league stages qualify for a random unseeded draw for the quarter-finals.

Quarter-Finals:
 Dromard 3-7, 1-13 Longford Slashers, Pearse Park, 22/8/2015,
 Killoe Young Emmets 2-10, 2-7 Mullinalaghta St Columba's, Pearse Park, 23/8/2015,
 Clonguish 1-16, 0-9 Colmcille, Pearse Park, 29/8/2015,
 Abbeylara 0-16, 0-10 St Mary's Granard, Pearse Park, 30/8/2015,
 Dromard 0-13, 0-12 Longford Slashers, Emmet Park, 30/8/2015, (Replay)

Semi-Finals:
 Killoe Young Emmets 2-11, 0-10 Dromard, Pearse Park, 6/9/2015,
 Abbeylara 1-10, 0-10 Clonguish, Pearse Park, 12/9/2015,

Final

Relegation Play Off 
Relegation Semi-Finals:
 Fr. Manning Gaels 2-6, 0-10 Ballymahon, Pearse Park, 22/8/2015,
 Mostrim 1-11, 1-6 Carrickedmond, Pearse Park, 23/8/2015,

Relegation Final:
 Ballymahon 2-10, 2-9 Carrickedmond, Devine Park, 29/8/2015,

Leinster Senior Club Football Championship

References 

Longford Senior Football Championship
Longford Senior Football Championship